Daniel Marcy (November 7, 1809 – November 3, 1893) was a United States representative from New Hampshire.  He was born in Portsmouth, New Hampshire where he attended the common schools. Becoming a sailor, he followed the sea and later engaged in shipbuilding.

Marcy was a member of the New Hampshire House of Representatives 1854–1857. He also served in the New Hampshire Senate in 1857 and 1858. He was an unsuccessful candidate for election to the Thirty-sixth Congress in 1858 and to the Thirty-seventh Congress in 1860. However, he was elected as a Democrat to the Thirty-eighth Congress (March 4, 1863 – March 3, 1865). He was an unsuccessful candidate for reelection in 1864 to the Thirty-ninth Congress. After leaving Congress, he again served in the New Hampshire Senate in 1871 and 1872. He died in Portsmouth in 1893 and was buried in the Proprietors’ Burying Ground.

References

1809 births
1893 deaths
Democratic Party members of the New Hampshire House of Representatives
Democratic Party New Hampshire state senators
Politicians from Portsmouth, New Hampshire
Democratic Party members of the United States House of Representatives from New Hampshire
19th-century American politicians